Club de Deportes Copiapó — or simply Deportes Copiapó — is a Chilean football club based in Copiapó, Atacama Region. Founded in 1999 after Regional Atacama's folding, it currently plays in the Primera División, the first level of the Chilean football system, and holds its home games at Estadio Luis Valenzuela Hermosilla which has a capacity of 8,000 spectators.

The club has spent the most of its history playing in the Primera B, reaching its promotion to top-level (Primera División) for the first time in 2022. Its only one honour was the Tercera División title in 2002.

It has a rivalry with Cobresal.

Titles
Tercera División: 1
2002

Current squad

2023 Summer Transfers

In

Out

Managers
 Nelson Cossio (2006–08), (2009–10)
 Gerardo Silva (2002–04), (2012–13)

See also
Regional Atacama
Chilean football league system

External links
Deportes Copiapó official Website 

Deportes Copiapó
Copiapo
Copiapo
Sport in Atacama Region
1999 establishments in Chile